The 2019 Louisville Cardinals football team represented the University of Louisville during the 2019 NCAA Division I FBS football season. This was the team's the first season under head coach Scott Satterfield. The Cardinals played their home games at Cardinal Stadium, formerly known as Papa John's Cardinal Stadium, in Louisville, Kentucky.

Preseason

Preseason media poll
In the preseason ACC media poll, Louisville was predicted to finish last in the Atlantic Division.

Schedule

Game summaries

Notre Dame

Eastern Kentucky

vs. Western Kentucky

at Florida State

Boston College

at Wake Forest

Clemson

Virginia

at Miami (FL)

at NC State

Syracuse

at Kentucky

vs Mississippi State (Music City Bowl)

References

Louisville
Louisville Cardinals football seasons
Music City Bowl champion seasons
Louisville Cardinals football